Imitate Modern is a London-based contemporary photography and art gallery that exhibits work by emerging artists.

About 
Imitate Modern was launched in 2011, initially occupying a space in Marylebone, London. In 2015 it became a pop-up gallery, opening in various locations, including 90 Piccadilly and Goodwood Festival of Speed. In 2016 the gallery moved to its new permanent space at 19 Shepherd Market, London.

Imitate Modern hosted the first London solo exhibitions for Tyler Shields, Cartrain and Stik. In 2012, the French artist Philippe Shangti presents his exhibition "Saint Tropez to London" whose 28 provocative color images present a visual cocktail of drugs, fetishism, anarchy, sex and death. Imitate Modern hosted a solo exhibition by Rich Simmons, and a retrospective dedicated to Kate Moss's anniversary in 2014 by Russell Marshall called 40.

References 

2011 establishments in the United Kingdom
Contemporary art galleries in London